Jerome McKinley "Gerald" Henderson Sr. (born January 16, 1956) is an American retired basketball player. He was a combo guard who had a 13-year career in the National Basketball Association (NBA) from 1979 until 1992.  He played for the Boston Celtics, Seattle SuperSonics, New York Knicks, Philadelphia 76ers, Milwaukee Bucks, Detroit Pistons, and Houston Rockets. Henderson was born in Richmond, Virginia and attended Virginia Commonwealth University.

Henderson is best known for his steal of a James Worthy pass to score a game-tying layup in Game 2 of the 1984 NBA Finals between the Boston Celtics and the Los Angeles Lakers. The Celtics eventually prevailed in overtime. In a post-game interview, Henderson said that "For a minute I could hear Johnny Most going, 'Henderson steals the ball!'", in reference to Most's famous call of John Havlicek's steal in the 1965 Eastern Conference finals. Most's actual words were "It goes quickly in now to Magic, back over to Worthy, and it's picked off! Goes to Henderson, he lays it up and in! It's all tied up! A great play by Henderson!"

In the fall of 1984, Henderson was traded to Seattle for the Sonics' first-round pick in 1986, which the Celtics would use to draft Len Bias. In 1990, while a member of the Detroit Pistons, Henderson scored at the last second of Game 4 of the NBA Finals, sealing the victory for the Pistons.

As of 2006, he and his wife run a real estate business in Blue Bell, Pennsylvania. Their son, Gerald Henderson Jr. was selected by the Charlotte Bobcats of the National Basketball Association in the 2009 NBA draft. Gerald Jr. played eight NBA seasons for the Charlotte Bobcats/Hornets, Portland Trail Blazers, and Philadelphia 76ers.

In 2012, Henderson was inducted into the Virginia Sports Hall of Fame.

NBA career statistics

Regular season

|-
| align="left" | 1979–80
| align="left" | Boston
| 76 || 2 || 14.0 || .500 || .333 || .690 || 1.1 || 1.9 || 0.6 || 0.2 || 6.2
|-
| style="text-align:left;background:#afe6ba;" | 1980–81†
| align="left" | Boston
| 82 || 10 || 19.6 || .451 || .063 || .720 || 1.6 || 2.6 || 1.0 || 0.1 || 7.8
|-
| align="left" | 1981–82
| align="left" | Boston
| 82 || 31 || 22.5 || .501 || .167 || .727 || 1.9 || 3.1 || 1.0 || 0.1 || 10.2
|-
| align="left" | 1982–83
| align="left" | Boston
| 82 || 9 || 18.9 || .463 || .188 || .722 || 1.5 || 2.4 || 1.2 || 0.0 || 8.2
|-
| style="text-align:left;background:#afe6ba;" | 1983–84†
| align="left" | Boston
| 78 || 78 || 26.8 || .524 || .351 || .768 || 1.9 || 3.8 || 1.5 || 0.2 || 11.6
|-
| align="left" | 1984–85
| align="left" | Seattle
| 79 || 78 || 33.5 || .479 || .237 || .780 || 2.4 || 7.1 || 1.8 || 0.1 || 13.4
|-
| align="left" | 1985–86
| align="left" | Seattle
| 82 || 82 || 31.3 || .482 || .346 || .830 || 2.3 || 5.9 || 1.7 || 0.1 || 13.1
|-
| align="left" | 1986–87
| align="left" | Seattle
| 6 || 6 || 25.8 || .500 || .000 || .944 || 1.5 || 5.3 || 1.0 || 0.0 || 11.2
|-
| align="left" | 1986–87
| align="left" | New York
| 68 || 53 || 27.8 || .438 || .257 || .816 || 2.4 || 6.5 || 1.4 || 0.2 || 10.9
|-
| align="left" | 1987–88
| align="left" | New York
| 6 || 2 || 11.5 || .357 || .500 || 1.000 || 1.7 || 2.2 || 0.3 || 0.0 || 2.3
|-
| align="left" | 1987–88
| align="left" | Philadelphia
| 69 || 3 || 20.8 || .431 || .421 || .810 || 1.4 || 3.2 || 1.0 || 0.1 || 8.4
|-
| align="left" | 1988–89
| align="left" | Philadelphia
| 65 || 0 || 15.2 || .414 || .308 || .819 || 1.0 || 2.2 || 0.6 || 0.0 || 6.5
|-
| align="left" | 1989–90
| align="left" | Milwaukee
| 11 || 0 || 11.7 || .423 || .429 || 1.000 || 1.1 || 1.2 || 0.7 || 0.0 || 2.5
|-
| style="text-align:left;background:#afe6ba;" | 1989–90†
| align="left" | Detroit
| 46 || 0 || 7.3 || .506 || .452 || .769 || 0.7 || 1.3 || 0.2 || 0.0 || 2.3
|-
| align="left" | 1990–91
| align="left" | Detroit
| 23 || 10 || 17.0 || .427 || .333 || .762 || 1.6 || 2.7 || 0.5 || 0.1 || 5.3
|-
| align="left" | 1991–92
| align="left" | Houston
| 8 || 0 || 4.3 || .364 || .000 || .667 || 0.3 || 0.6 || 0.0 || 0.0 || 1.5
|-
| align="left" | 1991–92
| align="left" | Detroit
| 8 || 0 || 7.8 || .381 || .600 || 1.000 || 0.8 || 0.6 || 0.4 || 0.0 || 3.0
|- class="sortbottom"
| style="text-align:center;" colspan="2"| Career
| 871 || 364 || 21.6 || .472 || .332 || .776 || 1.7 || 3.6 || 1.1 || 0.1 || 8.9
|}

Playoffs

|-
| align="left" | 1979–80
| align="left" | Boston
| 9 || – || 11.2 || .405 || .000 || .600 || 1.1 || 1.3 || 0.4 || 0.0 || 4.7
|-
| style="text-align:left;background:#afe6ba;" | 1980–81†
| align="left" | Boston
| 16 || – || 14.3 || .477 || .000 || .833 || 1.6 || 1.6 || 0.6 || 0.2 || 5.8
|-
| align="left" | 1981–82
| align="left" | Boston
| 12 || – || 25.8 || .409 || .000 || .686 || 2.1 || 4.0 || 1.2 || 0.2 || 8.3
|-
| align="left" | 1982–83
| align="left" | Boston
| 7 || – || 26.7 || .412 || .000 || .857 || 2.0 || 4.4 || 1.6 || 0.1 || 10.9
|-
| style="text-align:left;background:#afe6ba;" | 1983–84†
| align="left" | Boston
| style="background:#cfecec;"| 23* || – || 26.8 || .485 || .273 || .720 || 2.3 || 4.2 || 1.5 || 0.0 || 12.5
|-
| align="left" | 1988–89
| align="left" | Philadelphia
| 3 || 0 || 23.0 || .400 || .286 || .333 || 2.3 || 1.7 || 0.7 || 0.0 || 8.0
|-
| style="text-align:left;background:#afe6ba;" | 1989–90†
| align="left" | Detroit
| 8 || 0 || 2.4 || .200 || .000 || .000 || 0.4 || 0.5 || 0.3 || 0.0 || 0.3
|-
| align="left" | 1990–91
| align="left" | Detroit
| 10 || 1 || 4.0 || .250 || .000 || .000 || 0.1 || 0.6 || 0.1 || 0.0 || 0.8
|- class="sortbottom"
| style="text-align:center;" colspan="2"| Career
| 88 || 1 || 17.8 || .443 || .156 || .697 || 1.6 || 2.6 || 0.9 || 0.1 || 7.2
|}

References

External links
Where Are They Now?: Gerald Henderson
NBA stats @ basketball-reference.com

1956 births
Living people
20th-century African-American sportspeople
21st-century African-American people
African-American basketball players
American men's basketball players
Basketball players from Richmond, Virginia
Boston Celtics players
Detroit Pistons players
Houston Rockets players
Milwaukee Bucks players
New York Knicks players
People from Montgomery County, Pennsylvania
Philadelphia 76ers players
Point guards
San Antonio Spurs draft picks
Seattle SuperSonics players
Shooting guards
VCU Rams men's basketball players
Western Basketball Association players